The 1916 Vanderbilt Commodores football team represented Vanderbilt University in the 1916 Southern Intercollegiate Athletic Association football season. The 1916 season was Dan McGugin's 13th year as head coach. Quarterback Irby Curry was selected third-team All-America by Walter Camp.

Schedule

Season summary

Southwestern Presbyterian
The season opened against  with a 86–0 win.

Transylvania
In the second week of play,  was beaten, 42–0.

Kentucky
Vanderbilt defeated Kentucky, 45–0. Vanderbilt coach Dan McGugin stated "If you would give me Doc Rodes, I would say he was a greater player than Curry."

Ole Miss
Vanderbilt beatOle Miss, 35–0.

Virginia
Vanderbilt beat Virginia, 27–6. Josh Cody made a 50-yard field goal.

Rose Poly
Vanderbilt beat , 67–0.

Tennessee
Tennessee upset Vanderbilt, 10–6. Vanderbilt's lone score came on a 70-yard run by Rabbit Curry. The year's only unanimous All-Southern Graham Vowell scored Tennessee's winning touchdown.

The starting lineup was Adams (left end), Cody (left tackle), Williams (left guard), Hamilton (center), Harman (right guard), Lipscomb (right tackle), Cohen (right end), Curry (quarterback), Floyd (left halfback), Zerfoss (right halfback), Ray (fullback).

Auburn

Sources:

Vanderbilt eliminated Auburn from SIAA title contention by a 20–9 score. Josh Cody carried the ball over for the first touchdown. Rabbit Curry played well at the start, but could not play the entire game due to an ankle injury. Moon Ducote made a 45-yard field goal in the third quarter to put the Tigers up 9–7. With the help of the forward pass, the Commodores scored two further touchdowns in the last quarter.

The starting lineup was Zerfoss (left end), Cody (left tackle), Williams (left guard), Hamilton (center), Carman (right guard), Lipscomb (right tackle), Cohen (right end), Curry (quarterback), Richardson (left halfback), Beasley (right halfback), Ray (fullback).

Sewanee

Sources:

Vanderbilt and rival Sewanee fought to a scoreless tie. Red Floyd fumbled in the shadow of the goalpost.

References

Additional sources
 

Vanderbilt
Vanderbilt Commodores football seasons
Vanderbilt Commodores football